Funhouse is the fifth studio album by American singer and songwriter Pink, released by LaFace Records worldwide on October 24, 2008. The album debuted at number two on the Billboard 200 chart, selling 180,000 copies in its first week and reached number one on the charts in seven countries including Australia, New Zealand, Netherlands and the United Kingdom. Funhouse has sold 7 million copies worldwide.

Singles from the album include the international number-one single "So What", "Sober", "Please Don't Leave Me", "Funhouse", "I Don't Believe You", and "Glitter in the Air". Funhouse earned Pink three Grammy Award nominations and five MTV Video Music Award nominations. Funhouse was re-released in late 2009 to include a bonus DVD, and was accompanied by the release of Funhouse Tour: Live in Australia, a live album taped during Pink's Australian leg of the Funhouse Tour.

Writing and development 
Pink has stated that this album is her most vulnerable and personal album to date. Much of the album's subject matter alludes to the fact that Moore had recently separated from her husband, Carey Hart. The first single, "So What", opens with:  "I guess I just lost my husband/I don't know where he went". "Please Don't Leave Me" also addresses the split. The artist sums up its theme thus: "Okay, I'm an asshole, but love me anyway." In "Mean", she sings, "It was good in the beginning/but how did we get so mean?"

The song that Moore is the most proud of is "Crystal Ball". She said about the track: "I recorded it in one take and we didn't mix it. It just went straight to master. It was all about a vibe and not about perfection or being polished. I just love that song and I loved recording it." She wrote the song with Billy Mann, who also aided her with the songs "Stupid Girls", "Dear Mr. President" and "I'm Not Dead" (all 2006), among others.

In "It's All Your Fault", Pink blames her lover for giving her hopes of a love relationship, then simply giving up on her. She proclaims in the lyrics "I conjure up the thought of being gone, but I'd probably even do that wrong." In "Glitter in the Air", Pink asks many questions such as, "Have you ever looked fear in the face and said I just don't care?", and "Have you ever hated yourself for staring at the phone?" Pink admits, "I still don't have some of the answers to the questions I pose on this record. I'm still figuring it all out."

The track "Sober", which is the album's second single, was written by Pink at a party hosted at her home, where everyone was drunk or drinking except for her, and she wanted them all to leave. She went to the beach and had a line in her head saying "How do I feel so good sober?". Eventually it had nothing to do with alcohol but with identities. "How do I feel so good with just me, without anyone to lean on?", Pink said in an interview.

"Ave Mary A" deals with world issues and problems. "One Foot Wrong" talks about an acid trip that went wrong, but also has an underlying theme. "That song is also about losing control and how easy it is to lose the plot in life and teeter on the edge."

Originally, Pink wanted to call her album Heartbreak Is a Motherfucker, but her record label declined because of a fear that offensive language would affect sales. She also said that she did not want the album to look like a break-up album; "There is a lot of that [break-up], but there is fun happening too and that's why I named it Funhouse in the end." Pink has also stated that she sees life as a carnival: "Clowns are supposed to be happy, but they are really scary. Carnivals are supposed to be fun, but really they are kind of creepy." [...] "and that's like life to me, and love. Love is supposed to be fun, but it can sometimes be really scary. And the funhouse mirrors that make you look so distorted that you don't recognize yourself and you ask yourself, 'How did I get here? How do I get out of here?' But, you think that you want to do it again. That is the same as love and life. It's a metaphor for being in love and for life." This also shows in the title track "Funhouse" where she tells that it used to be fun. "It's about when the box you're in doesn't fit anymore, burn that fucker down and start a new one."

Recording
Pink wrote and recorded approximately 30 to 35 songs for Funhouse. "It's like getting rid of your children: 'I like that one too, but I'm going to let that one die,'" she said of choosing the album's tracks. "The good thing now is that different countries want extra songs and B-sides, so there's always a home for the other kids."
Pink traveled internationally to write and record the album, working with Eg White in London and with Max Martin in Stockholm. "It was really good to get out of my house and get away from my life. No distractions. No phones", Pink said of her sessions outside the U.S.

Promotion 

 Pink released a deluxe edition of the album in an original steel box. The box set includes all the standard and bonus tracks in an Enhanced CD which includes the "So What" music video, in addition to an extra T-shirt with the official Pink logo for the album. The box did not get a worldwide release.
 To promote the new album and single, Pink twice guest-hosted the new TV-station FNMTV, and the music video for "So What" made its world premiere on FNMTV on August 22, 2008.
 On September 7, Pink performed "So What" live at the 2008 American MTV Video Music Awards.
 On September 22, 2008, Pink performed on MuchMusic for a Live @ Much special.
 Pink visited Australia during October for promotion of the album, which included a performance at the 2008 ARIA Awards ceremony in Sydney on October 19. She returned to Australia as part of her The Funhouse Tour in May 2009.
 Pink performed various songs from her new album on 4Music on October 5, 2008, including "So What", "Sober", "Please Don't Leave Me" and her U.K. number 1 hit "Just Like a Pill".
 On Friday October 24, 2008, Pink performed the song "Funhouse" live as world premiere of the song from the album of the same name on Sunrise an Australian Breakfast Television program.
 Pink performed a "Secret Gig" at The Metro, Sydney, while in Australian on Promo.
 Pink's Funhouse iPhone App was created in support of Funhouse and represents the first artist themed promotional app to be made for the iPhone App platform.
 On November 6, 2008, Pink performed her hit single "So What" at the MTV Europe Music Awards during a live show where 40 000 feathers were released on stage making her unable to sing the line "And you're a tool, so..."
 Pink also performed her second Funhouse single, "Sober", at the 2008 American Music Awards on November 23, 2008,
 Pink performed a "Secret Gig" at The Cafe Du Paris, London on November 4, 2008
 Pink held a secret showcase in Barcelona, Spain on November 20.
 Pink appeared at the Bellagio Hotel in Las Vegas, Nevada on November 7, 2008, for her album debut party.
 Pink has appeared on many talk shows to help promote the album — The Today Show on October 28; The View on October 29; Late Night with Conan O'Brien on October 30; CBS Early Show on November 3; and The Ellen DeGeneres Show on November 24.
 Pink recorded a performance for Divas II benefit for breast cancer on November 23 in the UK. She could not be there due to performing at the American Music Awards.
 She performed on For One Night Only in the UK.
 Pink appeared on The Paul O'Grady Show in London in September 2008.
 Pink appeared on German talk show Wetten, dass..? in 2008.
 On November 3, 2008, Pink performed Sober on Australian Idol Verdict Show.
 On September 13, 2009, Pink performed "Sober" at the 2009 MTV Video Music Awards.
 On January 31, 2010, Pink performed "Glitter in the Air" at the 52nd Grammy Awards, following the performance the song debuted at number 18 on the Billboard Hot 100 and number 13 on the Canadian Hot 100. The performance was also highly critically acclaimed by celebrities, TV talk shows and the public in general.
 Pink appeared on The Oprah Winfrey Show on February 5, 2010. She sat down with Winfrey to speak about her Grammy performance as well as her breakup with husband Carey Hart, which was followed by a performance of "I Don't Believe You".
 Promotion ended with the Funhouse Summer Carnival and P!nk headed to studio to record songs for her following album, Greatest Hits... So Far!!! and take a break during her pregnancy.

Singles 

"So What"
The song was written by Pink, in collaboration with Max Martin and Shellback, about her separation. The song is the album's lead single, released in August 2008. It has become Pink's biggest success to date, peaking at number one in eleven countries around the world. It is also Pink's first solo single to top the Billboard Hot 100.

"Sober"
On November 3, 2008, the song was released as the second single from the album. It was written by Pink, Nate "Danja" Hills, Kara DioGuardi and Marcella Araica, and produced by Danja, Kanal and Jimmy Harry. Promotion for the song included a November 23 performance at the American Music Awards. The song's video, directed by Jonas Åkerlund, premiered November 25 on Pink's official YouTube channel. The B-side for the single is the non-album track "When We're Through", co-written by Pink and Butch Walker.

"Please Don't Leave Me"
The song's release date was changed after its music video and cover art were leaked online. It was released in January 2009 in Australia and in March 2009 in the United States. It reached the Top 20 in several countries and received a Platinum certification from RIAA for one million units sold, all despite the several issues which accompanied its release.

"Bad Influence"
The song was released as the fourth single in Australia, promoting the arrival of the Australian leg of the Funhouse Tour. It was sent to Australian radio in April 2009 and a CD single was released in May 2009. The song became a huge success in Oceania despite the absence of a music video, reaching the Top 10 in both Australia and New Zealand. It was released as a single in Germany on March 26, 2010. It manage to reach number 26 on Germany's official Singles Chart.

"Funhouse"
It was announced that "Funhouse" will be the fourth worldwide single. It was released in the UK on August 3, 2009, and in the U.S. on August 25, 2009. The music video premiered on June 20, 2009, in the United Kingdom on 4music at 11:00am. Tony Kanal of No Doubt, also the co-writer and the producer of the song, appears in the music video, playing a piano. "Funhouse" became the lowest Billboard charter, reaching #44, until the release of "I Don't Believe You" which failed to chart.

"I Don't Believe You"
"I Don't Believe You" was announced as the fifth worldwide single from the album. It was released in the U.S. on October 5, 2009, to Hot AC radio, it failed to enter the Billboard Hot 100, making it Pink's least successful single in the U.S. The song is considered to be Pink's most vulnerable to date and is about her husband Carey Hart, as are most of the songs on the album. Pink performed the song on February 5, 2010, on The Oprah Winfrey Show.

"Glitter in the Air"
Pink performed "Glitter in the Air" on January 31, 2010, at the 52nd Grammy Awards, where she received for her performance a standing ovation. Also, many celebrities and media outlets praised her performance. The song was immediately delivered digitally to radio as a new single by Jive Records before the Grammy broadcast was even over. On the February 20, 2010, issue of Billboard, the song debuted on the Hot 100 at #18, Pink's second highest debut after "So What", as well as her seventh entry from Funhouse, which gives the song credit for raising the sales of the album and pulling it back to the Top 20 on the Billboard 200.

Promotional singles 
"Ave Mary A"
The track was released as a radio-only single in Australia and peaked at #10 on the Australian Airplay Chart. It was featured on the Autumn 2010 edition of compilation CD So Fresh. It was the 24th most played track on Australian radio in 2010. It never charted on the ARIA Singles Chart.

Tour 

European, Australian and North American tour dates for the Funhouse Tour were announced to support the album in early 2009. The first leg of the Funhouse Tour would go throughout Europe. Pink later did a 3-month stint in Australia. The third leg of the tour took place in North America, with 11 dates in the United States and 1 date in Canada. The fourth leg consisted of 3 months around Europe, starting in Dublin, Ireland on October 14 and finishing December 20 in Hannover, Germany.

Pink broke her own record in Australia where she sold-out seventeen shows in Melbourne (more than any other city). Melbourne also had the most tickets and had the biggest revenue.  Pink also sold out seven consecutive shows in Sydney in a collective week, all within forty minutes. The overwhelming demand for shows in Australia made Pink surpass her record-breaking run of 35 sold-out shows achieved on the 2007 Australian leg of the I'm Not Dead Tour. The Funhouse Tour made 58 shows in Australia, which made Pink the most successful artist to ever tour the country. Other records broken by the tour included the most shows at the Sydney Entertainment Centre and Brisbane Entertainment Centre.

Also, the tour dates announced in the US would become the first time that Pink would tour in her home country since 2006. The first show was held in Seattle in September 2009 and twelve dates later the US leg of the tour ended in New York City.

A year later, she did the Funhouse Summer Carnival Tour in Europe.

Critical reception 

Funhouse has a score of 69 out of 100 from Metacritic based on 20 "generally favorable" reviews. Sydney's The Daily Telegraph gave it 4.5 stars, writing, "The record is a balanced blend of upbeat pop gems and midtempo ballads [...] The power of Pink's pop lies in the clever juxtaposition of heartfelt honesty about her life with anthematic choruses and irresistible melodies tailormade to be screamed out by her fans."

Other positive reviews were published by US Magazine, which gave the album four stars, saying "The rebellious Grammy winner again fuses unrestrained lyrics with perfect pop-rock hooks on her electrifying fifth CD. From her aggressive No. 1 hit 'So What' to the vulnerable 'Please Don't Leave Me' and the openhearted ballad 'I Don't Believe You', Pink confirms she's still in excellent fighting shape." In his Consumer Guide, Robert Christgau picked out the single from the album, "So What", as a "choice cut".

Less favorable reviews came from sources such as Rolling Stone and Blender, each giving the album three stars. Rolling Stone stated, "Pink has shown more personality before, and some cuts, including the goopy ballad "I Don't Believe You", make her sound like just another big-voiced chart-buster. Funhouse would be more fun if Pink went easier on the bad-love songs."

Commercial performance 
Four versions of Funhouse were released to the U.S. iTunes Store: two versions of the original, one explicit and one clean; two versions of the deluxe, one explicit and one clean.

Funhouse debuted at number two on the United States Billboard 200 chart issued on November 18, 2008, with sales of 180,000, behind AC/DC's Wal-Mart exclusive, Black Ice, which claimed the top spot with its second-week sales of 271,000. In March 2009, it was certified platinum by the RIAA for shipments of over 1,000,000 copies, and as of June 2012, the album has sold 1,960,000 copies in the United States. It was Pink's highest-charting album in that country, until her sixth album The Truth About Love debuted at number one.

In Australia, record shops broke embargo and placed Funhouse on sale one day before its official release date; with only one day of sales, it became the fourth-highest selling album of the week, shifting 7,120 copies. Funhouse debuted officially at number one in Australia, and sold 86,273 units that week (the highest first week sales of 2008). Funhouse spent nine consecutive weeks at number one and has been certified 12× platinum by the Australian Recording Industry Association for 840,000 copies sold. The album ended both 2008 and 2009 as the second highest selling album of the year in Australia, and was reported in 2010 to be the second most successful album of the 2000–2009 decade.

In the United Kingdom, the album sold over 37,100 copies in its first day and 83,000 copies in its first five days. Funhouse became her first number-one album in the UK, entering at number one on November 2, 2008, and has been certified 4× Platinum by the British Phonographic Industry for selling over 1,200,000 copies. Funhouse was the ninth biggest selling record of 2008, and the twenty-third biggest seller of 2009.

Funhouse debuted at number one in the Netherlands, New Zealand (certified 3× Platinum), and Switzerland (certified 3× Platinum) In Germany, Funhouse debuted at number two.
There, it is the sixth best-selling album of 2009 and the twenty-third best-selling album of 2010, shipping more than 1,000,000 copies as of June 2010. It is certified 4× Platinum.

Funhouse Tour: Live in Australia 

With the release of The Tour Edition, a live album was released featuring live performances of twelve songs, plus "Push You Away", a studio track which was previously unreleased; the song is also included on The Tour Edition. While the DVD includes 23 live performances, including 2 bonus performances. A Blu-ray version of the DVD was also released. The album and DVD were recorded in Sydney, Australia on July 17 and July 18.

Track listing 

Notes
  signifies a co-producer.

Personnel 
Adapted from AllMusic.

 Deborah Anderson – photography
 Tommy Andersson – assistant, audio engineer
 Marcella Araica – audio engineer, engineer
 Guy Baker – trumpet
 Stevie Blacke – arranger, performer, string arrangements, strings
 Daniel Chase – programming
 Al Clay – audio production, engineer, mixing, producer
 Tom Coyne – mastering
 Jake Davies – audio engineer, audio production, engineer, mixing assistant
 Roger Davies – management
 DJ Willrock – turntables
 Darren Dodd – drums
 Chris Galland – assistant, audio engineer, guitar, mixing assistant
 Brian Gately – production coordination
 Şerban Ghenea – mixing
 Matty Green – audio engineer, mixing assistant
 Keith Gretlein – assistant engineer, audio engineer
 Kinnda Hamid – background vocals
 John Hanes – audio engineer, digital editing
 Jimmy Harry – audio engineer, engineer, guitars, keyboards, producer
 Jeri Helden – art direction, design
 Femio Hernández – assistant, audio engineer
 Michael Ilbert – audio engineer, engineer
 Henrik Janson – arranger, string arrangements, string conductor, strings
 Uli Janson – arranger, string arrangements, string conductor, strings
 Neil Kanal – assistant engineer, audio engineer
 Tony Kanal – bass, producer
 Josh Kane – drums
 Craig Logan – A&R
 Tom Lord-Alge – mixing
 Dag Lundquist – engineer
 Robin Mortensen Lynch – guitar, programming
 MachoPsycho – audio production
 Billy Mann – audio production, guitars, keyboards, mixing, producer, background vocals
 Roger Manning – keyboards, piano
 Steven Manzano – management
 Max Martin – audio engineer, audio production, engineer, guitar, bass guitar, keyboards, producer
 Andrew McPherson – photography
 Lasse Mortén – assistant, audio engineer
 Niklas Olovson – bass, programming
 Amy Oresman – make-up
  Peter Parente – guitars
 Lisa Pinero – production coordination
 P!nk – primary artist, lead vocals, background vocals
 Serena Radaelli – hair stylist
 Delwyn Rees – management
 Tim Roberts – assistant, audio engineer
 Nancy Roof – a&r
 Michele Schweitzer – publicity
 Shellback – bass, drum programming, drums, guitars, keyboards, omnichord
 Paul Starr – make-up
 Nick Steinhardt – art direction, design
 Mark "Spike" Stent – mixing
 Stockholm Session Strings – strings
 Trish Summerville – stylist
 Irene Taylor – management
 Doug Tyo – assistant
 Butch Walker – audio production, bass, guitar, keyboards, percussion, producer, programming, background vocals
 Pete Wallace – audio engineer, bass, engineer, guitar, harmonium, piano, producer, programming
 Joey Waronker – drums
 Eg White – arranger, audio production, drums, engineer, guitar, Hammond B3 organ, moog bass, percussion, producer, strings
 John Yarling – drums
 Joe Zook – audio engineer, engineer

Charts

Weekly charts

Year-end charts

Decade-end charts

Certifications

Accolades

2008

2009

2010

Release history

See also 
List of best-selling albums in Australia

References

External links 
 Funhouse at Metacritic

2008 albums
Albums produced by Butch Walker
Albums produced by Danja (record producer)
Albums produced by Greg Wells
Albums produced by Max Martin
Pink (singer) albums
Sony Music albums
LaFace Records albums
Zomba Group of Companies albums